Until We Have Wings is an album by Randy Stonehill, released in 1990, on Myrrh Records.

Track listing
All songs written by Randy Stonehill, except where otherwise noted.

Side one (studio tracks)
 "Faithful" (Randy Stonehill And Giovanni Audiori) – 3:24
 "Didn't It Rain"  – 6:11
 "Born to Love"  – 4:27
 "Breath of God"  – 2:59
 "The History in Your Eyes"  – 4:31
 "Can Hell Burn Hot Enough"  – 4:07
 "Old Clothes" (Randy Stonehill, David Edwards) – 4:03

Side two (live tracks)
 "Keep Me Runnin'"  – 5:49
 "Turning Thirty"  – 4:39
 "Ramada Inn"  – 4:00
 "Shut De Do"  – 11:35
 "Hymn"  – 4:33
 "Good News"  – 8:00
 "I'll Remember You"  – 3:43

Personnel 
 Randy Stonehill – lead vocals, backing vocals, acoustic guitar
 Mark Heard – keyboards, acoustic guitar, electric guitars, bass
 Tom Howard – synthesizers (1, 4), string arrangements (7)
 Ken Medema – acoustic piano (7)
 Bill Batstone – bass, fretless bass
 David Miner – acoustic bass
 David Raven – drums
 Brad Dutz – percussion
 Jerry Chamberlain – backing vocals 
 Pam Dwinell – backing vocals
 Sharon McCall – backing vocals

Production 
 Ray Ware – executive producer 
 Tom Willett – executive producer
 Mark Heard – producer, recording, mixing 
 Randy Stonehill – producer 
 Bryan Soucy – second engineer 
 Steve Hall – mastering at Future Disc (Hollywood, California)
 Hipke, Inc. – art direction, design 
 Roz Roos – additional art direction
 David Roth – photography 
 Annette Zeglen – hair, make-up

References

1990 albums
Randy Stonehill albums